"A Little Bit of You" is a song written by Trey Bruce and Craig Wiseman, and recorded by American country music singer Lee Roy Parnell.  It was released in May 1995 as the lead single from his album We All Get Lucky Sometimes, his first release for the Career Records branch of Arista Records.  The song spent 20 weeks on the Hot Country Songs charts, peaking at number two in 1995.

Music video
The music video was directed by Jim Yukich and premiered in mid-1995.

Chart performance
"A Little Bit of You" debuted at number 67 on the U.S. Billboard Hot Country Singles & Tracks for the week of May 20, 1995.

Year-end charts

References

1995 singles
Lee Roy Parnell songs
Songs written by Trey Bruce
Songs written by Craig Wiseman
Song recordings produced by Scott Hendricks
Arista Nashville singles
1995 songs